Élisabeth Loisel (born 1 August 1963) is a French former football player and manager. Throughout her career she played for Stade de Reims and VGA Saint-Maur. She was a member of the French national team between 1980 and her retirement in 1989 at 26.

In 1997 she was appointed the French national team's new manager. Under her tenancy France qualified for the 2003 World Cup and the 2001 and 2005 European Championships. She was sacked after France failed to qualify for the 2007 World Cup. That same year she was signed by the Chinese Football Association as China's manager for the 2008 Summer Olympics. However, she was sacked five months from the tournament, following a disappointing performance in the 2008 Algarve Cup.

She currently leads the Committee for Women's Football and the FIFA Women's World Cup in the French Football Federation.

References

External links
 
 

1963 births
Living people
People from Meaux
Footballers from Seine-et-Marne
French women's footballers
Women's association football defenders
Stade de Reims Féminines players
France women's international footballers
French football managers
Female association football managers
France women's national football team managers
China women's national football team managers
2003 FIFA Women's World Cup managers
French expatriate football managers
French expatriate sportspeople in China
Expatriate football managers in China